John Murton (1585 – c. 1626), also known as John Morton, was a co-founder of the Baptist faith in Great Britain.

John Murton had been a furrier by trade in Gainsborough-on-Trent and was a member of the 1607 Gainsborough Congregation that relocated to Amsterdam. Murton had been a close disciple of John Smyth while in Holland and eventually Murton returned to London with Thomas Helwys and his church.

Murton possibly spent time in prison with Helwys before his death, and then became the Elder of the congregation. Murton continued Helwys' traditions until 1624 when he had a falling out with the congregation. Murton wrote several books influencing later Baptists, such as Roger Williams who opened his influential book, "The Bloudy Tenent by reprinting parts of John Murton's anonymously published tract, A Most Humble Supplication of the King's Majesty's Loyal Subjects (1620)."

References

1585 births
1626 deaths
English Baptist ministers
17th-century Christian clergy